Crittendenia is a genus of lichenicolous (lichen-dwelling) fungi in the monogeneric family Crittendeniaceae. The genus was circumscribed in 2021 to contain two species, C. lichenicola, and the type, C. coppinsii. An additional 16 species were added to the genus the following year. The genus name honours British lichenologist Peter Crittenden.

Characteristics of Crittendenia include the tiny synnemata-like basidiomata, clamp connections, and aseptate tubular basidia from which 4–7 spores discharge passively, often in groups. The genus was originally considered to be of uncertain classification in the Agaricostilbomycetes; the family Crittendeniaceae was proposed in 2022 to contain the genus following molecular phylogenetic investigation.

Species
Crittendenia absistentis 
Crittendenia bacidinae 
Crittendenia bryostigmatis 
Crittendenia byssolomatis 
Crittendenia coppinsii 
Crittendenia crassitunicata 
Crittendenia heterodermiae 
Crittendenia hypotrachynae 
Crittendenia kakouettae 
Crittendenia lecanorae 
Crittendenia lecidellae 
Crittendenia lichenicola 
Crittendenia lopadii 
Crittendenia parvispora 
Crittendenia physciiphila 
Crittendenia physconiae 
Crittendenia stictae 
Crittendenia teloschistis

References

Agaricostilbales
Taxa described in 2021
Lichenicolous fungi
Basidiomycota genera